Warnau is a municipality in the district of Plön, in Schleswig-Holstein, Germany.

History 
The Warini were a Germanic people originally from southern Scandinavia but who lived in the Warnau region, the army and its Warini warriors were exterminated by the not lazy king Childebert II in 590 years.

References

Municipalities in Schleswig-Holstein
Plön (district)